Hong Gye-hui (1703–1771) was a scholar-official of the Joseon Dynasty Korea in the 18th century.

He was also diplomat and ambassador, representing Joseon interests in the 10th Edo period diplomatic mission to the Tokugawa shogunate in Japan.

1748 mission to Japan

In 1748, King Yeongjo of Joseon directed that a diplomatic mission to Japan would be dispatched.  This diplomatic mission functioned to the advantage of both the Japanese and the Koreans as a channel for developing a political foundation for trade.

This delegation was explicitly identified by the Joseon court as a "Communication Envoy" (tongsinsa).  The mission was understood to signify that relations were "normalized."

This embassy traveled to Edo in the 1st year of the Japanese era of Kan'en, according to the Japanese calendar in use at that time.  The chief envoy of this Joseon delegation was Hong Gye-hui.

Recognition in the West
Pak Tong-chi's historical significance was confirmed when his mission and his name were specifically mentioned in a widely distributed history published by the Oriental Translation Fund in 1834.

In the West, early published accounts of the Joseon kingdom are not extensive, but they are found in Sangoku Tsūran Zusetsu (published in Paris in 1832), and in Nihon ōdai ichiran (published in Paris in 1834).  Joseon foreign relations and diplomacy are explicitly referenced in the 1834 work.

Popular culture
 Portrayed by Jang Hyun-sung in the 2014 SBS TV series Secret Door.

See also
 Joseon diplomacy
 Joseon missions to Japan
 Joseon tongsinsa

Notes

References

 Daehwan, Noh.  "The Eclectic Development of Neo-Confucianism and Statecraft from the 18th to the 19th Century," Korea Journal (Winter 2003).
 Lewis, James Bryant. (2003). Frontier contact between chosŏn Korea and Tokugawa Japan. London: Routledge. 
 Titsingh, Isaac, ed. (1834). [Siyun-sai Rin-siyo/Hayashi Gahō, 1652], Nipon o daï itsi ran; ou,  Annales des empereurs du Japon.  Paris: Oriental Translation Fund of Great Britain and Ireland.  OCLC  84067437
 Walker, Brett L.  "Foreign Affairs and Frontiers in Early Modern Japan: A Historiographical Essay," Early Modern Japan. Fall, 2002, pp. 44–62, 124-128.
 Walraven, Boudewijn and Remco E. Breuker. (2007). Korea in the middle: Korean studies and area studies; Essays in Honour of Boudewijn Walraven. Leiden: CNWS Publications. ;

External links
 Joseon Tongsinsa Cultural Exchange Association ; 
 조선통신사연구 (Journal of Studies in Joseon Tongsinsa) 

1703 births
1771 deaths
18th-century Korean people
Korean diplomats